Lac La Biche was a provincial electoral district in Alberta mandated to return a single member to the Legislative Assembly of Alberta from 1952 to 1971.

It replaced the riding of Beaver River and received the north-east parts of Athabasca, including the town of McMurray. It was replaced in 1971 by Lac La Biche-McMurray with minor boundary changes.

Representation history

The district's first MLA was one-term member for the abolished riding of Beaver River, Harry Lobay, who sat with the Social Credit caucus in government. He was defeated in the 1952 election by Liberal Michael Maccagno.

Maccagno defended the riding in three successive elections, and was party leader between 1964 and 1968. He resigned his seat in that year, triggering a by-election which was won by Social Credit candidate Dan Bouvier.

Election results

1950s

For the 1959 election, rural districts were elected by the first past the post method instead of the previous instant runoff voting. No second round had ever been needed in Lac La Biche, but this change can be seen in the dramatic drop in spoiled (incorrectly marked) ballots.

1960s

Plebiscite results

1957 liquor plebiscite

On October 30, 1957 a stand alone plebiscite was held province wide in all 50 of the then current provincial electoral districts in Alberta. The government decided to consult Alberta voters to decide on liquor sales and mixed drinking after a divisive debate in the legislature. The plebiscite was intended to deal with the growing demand for reforming antiquated liquor control laws.

The plebiscite was conducted in two parts. Question A, asked in all districts, asked the voters if the sale of liquor should be expanded in Alberta, while Question B, asked in a handful of districts within the corporate limits of Calgary and Edmonton, asked if men and women should be allowed to drink together in establishments.

Province wide Question A of the plebiscite passed in 33 of the 50 districts while Question B passed in all five districts. Lac La Biche voted in favour of the proposal with a near landslide majority. Voter turnout in the district was poor, and fell significantly below the province wide average of 46%.

Official district returns were released to the public on December 31, 1957. The Social Credit government in power at the time did not consider the results binding. However the results of the vote led the government to repeal all existing liquor legislation and introduce an entirely new Liquor Act.

Municipal districts lying inside electoral districts that voted against the plebiscite were designated Local Option Zones by the Alberta Liquor Control Board and considered effective dry zones. Business owners who wanted a license had to petition for a binding municipal plebiscite in order to be granted a license.

References

Further reading

External links
Elections Alberta
The Legislative Assembly of Alberta

Former provincial electoral districts of Alberta